In enzymology, a N-acetyldiaminopimelate deacetylase is an enzyme that catalyzes the chemical reaction

N-acetyl-LL-2,6-diaminoheptanedioate + H2O  acetate + LL-2,6-diaminoheptanedioate

Thus, the two substrates of this enzyme are N-acetyl-LL-2,6-diaminoheptanedioate and H2O, whereas its two products are acetate and LL-2,6-diaminoheptanedioate.

This enzyme belongs to the family of hydrolases, those acting on carbon-nitrogen bonds other than peptide bonds, specifically in linear amides.  The systematic name of this enzyme class is N6-acetyl-LL-2,6-diaminoheptanedioate amidohydrolase. Other names in common use include N-acetyl-L-diaminopimelic acid deacylase, N-acetyl-LL-diaminopimelate deacylase, and 6-N-acetyl-LL-2,6-diaminoheptanedioate amidohydrolase.  This enzyme participates in lysine biosynthesis.

References

 
 
 

EC 3.5.1
Enzymes of unknown structure